Mathias Ranégie (born 14 June 1984) is a Swedish former professional footballer who played as a striker.

Club career

Early career
He started his career in Masthuggets BK, but left Sweden to be with his Guadeloupean father in Paris, France, he then started to play for Levallois SC in Championnat de France amateur. He then returned to Sweden and Gothenburg and played for Majorna BK for one year before they expend their senior team, he then moved to Lärje-Angereds IF where IFK Göteborg got interested in him and signed him prior to the 2007 season, however due to poor performance he only played 14 games and was in the autumn of 2008 loaned out to Go Ahead Eagles in the Dutch Eerste Divisie, yet a continuing injury made the Dutch club break the loan contract ahead of time.

Häcken
In 2009, he signed for IFK Göteborg's local rivals and newly promoted BK Häcken. His first season for his new club proved to be a success as he played 29 games (25 from start) and scored six goals during the team's successful campaign ending at an impressive fifth place in Allsvenskan. Following his successful 2009 season he was hailed by many as a future star and a possible candidate for the top scorer title in Allsvenskan 2010.

During the season 2011, it became apparent that Ranégie had improved since his season of 2010 when he scored 12 goals in 30 games. He immediately took a place as the topscorer in Allsvenskan 2011 and when he left the club he had scored 18 goals in 22 games.

Malmö FF
On 30 August 2011 Ranégie signed with Swedish champions Malmö FF. The transfer sum was one of the highest ever paid between two Swedish clubs. Ranégie made his debut against Gefle IF on 8 September 2011 and scored his first goal against Halmstads BK on 21 September 2011. On 25 September 2011, Ranégie sealed the championship win for Helsingborgs IF of the 2011 season by scoring the 1–1 tying goal against AIK who were the only championship competitors to Helsingborgs IF at that time. In total Ranégie played seven matches and scored three goals for his first season at Malmö FF.

Udinese
On the last day of the transfer window, in August 2012, Ranégie transferred to Serie A club Udinese on a five-year contract. Mathias scored his first goal for Udinese on 24 September, a header against Milan in a 2–1 victory.

Watford
On 3 January 2014, Ranégie joined Watford from Udinese on a deal until 2017. Ranégie finally made his full Watford debut against Yeovil Town on 18 February 2014. Ranégie opened his Watford account on his home debut, scoring twice in a 4–0 win over Blackpool on 1 March 2014. He left Watford at the end of the 2016–17 season.

Loan to Millwall
After falling down the pecking order at Watford, Ranégie moved on loan to fellow Championship side Millwall on 28 August 2014, until 1 January 2015. He made his debut two days later as a substitute against Blackpool on 30 August 2014.

Loan to Dalian Aerbin
On 28 January 2015, Ranégie moved on loan to China League One side Dalian Aerbin, until 31 December 2015. Upon his return to Watford, Ranégie was informed that he was free to leave the club.

Loan to Djurgården
In February 2016, Ranégie joined Allsvenskan side Djurgården on a one-season loan. He played 24 league games throughout the campaign, scoring six goals.

Later career
Ranégie was released by Watford upon the expiry of his contract at the end of the 2016-17 season, having not played competitively for the now-Premier League side since 2014. On 11 August 2017, he returned to former club BK Häcken, six years after initially leaving. Ranégie played 10 games for the club, scoring once, before leaving on a free transfer in November 2017.

International career
Following his performance during the 2009 season he was called up by the Sweden national team's coach Erik Hamrén for the 2010 January tour on the Arabian Peninsula. The squad selection for the camp traditionally feature the best Swedish players in domestic and other Scandinavian leagues. He was once again selected for 2012 tour but withdrew due to personal reasons.

Career statistics

Club

International

Scores and results list Sweden's goal tally first, score column indicates score after Ranégie goal.

Honours

IFK Göteborg
 Allsvenskan: 2007
 Svenska Cupen: 2008
 Svenska Supercupen: 2008

Individual
 Allsvenskan top scorer: 2011

References

External links
 
 Malmö FF profile 
 
 
 

1984 births
Living people
Swedish footballers
Sweden international footballers
Swedish people of French descent
Swedish people of Guadeloupean descent
Footballers from Gothenburg
Association football forwards
Go Ahead Eagles players
IFK Göteborg players
Levallois SC players
BK Häcken players
Malmö FF players
Udinese Calcio players
Watford F.C. players
Millwall F.C. players
Dalian Professional F.C. players
Syrianska FC players
China League One players
Allsvenskan players
Division 2 (Swedish football) players
Eerste Divisie players
Serie A players
English Football League players
Djurgårdens IF Fotboll players
Swedish expatriate footballers
Swedish expatriate sportspeople in Italy
Expatriate footballers in Italy
Swedish expatriate sportspeople in France
Expatriate footballers in France
Swedish expatriate sportspeople in England
Expatriate footballers in England
Swedish expatriate sportspeople in China
Expatriate footballers in China